= List of radio stations in Asunción =

This is a list of FM & AM radio stations in Asunción, Paraguay, and their frequencies. These are 29 FM and 17 AM stations in Asunción.

== FM (MHz) ==
- Conquistador FM 89.1
- Radio Mix 90.1 FM
- Radio Ysapy 90.7 FM
- ESTACIÓN 40 91.1 FM
- RQP 94.3 FM
- Radio Nacional del Paraguay 95.1 FM
- Rock & Pop 95.5 FM
- Amor 95.9 FM
- Disney 96.5 FM
- Latina 97.1 FM
- Memories 97.5 FM
- Radio Nuevo Tiempo 97.9 FM
- Cardinal Romance 98.5 FM
- Radio Corazón 99.1 FM
- CFA Radio 99.5
- Radio Canal 100 100.1 FM
- Montecarlo 100.9 FM
- Radio Farra 101.3 FM
- Radio Obedira 102.1 FM
- Radio Aspen 102.7 FM
- FM Popular 103.1
- Radio Cámara 104.1 FM
- Venus 105.1 FM
- Emisoras Paraguay 106.1 FM
- Palma 106.5 FM
- Urbana 106.9 FM
- Radio María 107.3 FM
- Siete 107.7 FM

== AM (kHz) ==
- Radio La Tribu 650 AM
- Radio Cáritas UC 680 AM
- Radio ABC Cardinal 730 AM
- Radio 1º de Marzo 780 AM
- Radio La Unión 800 AM
- Radio Nacional del Paraguay 920 AM
- Universo 970 AM
- Radio 1000 1000 AM
- Radio Ñandutí 1020 AM
- Radio Monumental 1080 AM
- La Tribu Deport 1120 AM
- Rádio IPDA Paraguay 1160 AM
- Radio Libre 1200 AM
- Radio Libertad 1250 AM
- Radio Fe y Alegría 1300 AM
- Radio Chaco Boreal 1330 AM
- Radio Iglesia 1480 AM
